The plain greenbul (Eurillas curvirostris) is a species of the bulbul family of passerine birds. 
It is found in western and central Africa.
Its natural habitats are subtropical or tropical dry forest, subtropical or tropical moist lowland forest, and subtropical or tropical moist montane forest.

Taxonomy and systematics
The plain greenbul was originally described in the genus Andropadus and was re-classified to the genus Eurillas in 2010. Alternatively, some authorities classify the plain greenbul in the genus Pycnonotus.

Subspecies
Two subspecies are recognized:
 E. c. curvirostris - (Cassin, 1859): Found from central Ghana to western Kenya, southern Democratic Republic of Congo and northern Angola
 E. c. leonina - (Bates, 1930): Found from Sierra Leone to central Ghana

References

plain greenbul
Birds of the Gulf of Guinea
Birds of Sub-Saharan Africa
plain greenbul
Taxonomy articles created by Polbot